Smithton may refer to several places:

In the United Kingdom

Smithton, Highland, a community near Culloden in Scotland.

In Australia

Smithton, Tasmania
Smithton Airport

In the United States

Smithton, Illinois
Smithton Township, St. Clair County, Illinois
Smithton, Missouri
Smithton Township, Pettis County, Missouri
Smithton, Pennsylvania
Smithville, West Virginia, also known as Smithton
Smithton High School, a high school in Smithton Missouri